Growth curve can refer to:
Growth curve (statistics), an empirical model of the evolution of a quantity over time.
Growth curve (biology), a statistical growth curve used to model a biological quantity.
Curve of growth (astronomy), the relation between the equivalent width and the optical depth.